Mark Levitt Batshaw (born 19 September 1945) is a Canadian-born physician, medical researcher and academic administrator. He is a professor in the department of pediatrics and an associate dean at the George Washington University School of Medicine & Health Sciences and is the physician-in-chief and chief academic officer at the Children’s National Medical Center in Washington, D.C.  He is known for his research into urea cycle disorders and gene therapy, and is the author of the classic textbook "Children with Disabilities".

Biography 
Batshaw was born in Montreal, Canada, in 1945 and is a United States citizen.  His father, Manuel G. Batshaw, was a social worker. Batshaw manifested dyslexia and attention deficit hyperactivity disorder as a child at a time where there were limited special education services or medication for treatment. It was this experience that led him to the fields of developmental pediatrics and genetics.

Batshaw received his M.D. from the University of Chicago Pritzker School of Medicine in 1971, performed his pediatric residency at The Hospital for Sick Children, University of Toronto, and his clinical fellowship at the Kennedy Krieger Institute, Johns Hopkins Hospital.

From 1988-1998, Batshaw was Physician-in-Chief of the Children’s Seashore House at the Children’s Hospital of Philadelphia. He was Chairman of Pediatrics at the George Washington University School of Medicine & Health Sciences from 1998-2014 and as of 2017 is the Associate Dean for Academic Affairs at the university, and Chief Academic Officer and Physician-in-Chief at Children's National Medical Center.  He has served as president of both the Society for Inherited Metabolic Disorders and the American Pediatric Society.

He and his wife Karen are the parents of three children.

Research 
During his clinical fellowship at the Kennedy Krieger Institute, Batshaw and his colleague Saul Brusilow developed a successful treatment for a fatal urea cycle disorder. The treatment, involving sodium phenylbutyrate and glycerol phenylbutyrate, is still in use.

In 1988, Batshaw moved from Hopkins to the University of Pennsylvania where he began a collaboration with James Wilson. They developed an adenovirus vector and started a gene therapy clinical trial that resulted in the death of a patient, Jesse Gelsinger, in 1999 and a subsequent slowdown of the development of gene therapy. In the past decade, the field has recovered
and Wilson and Batshaw’s teams have developed an adeno-associated virus vector that has been successful in preclinical studies of an animal model of urea cycle disorders.

References 

Living people
1945 births
George Washington University faculty
American geneticists
Canadian emigrants to the United States
People from Montreal
Pritzker School of Medicine alumni
University of Pennsylvania alumni